The 2017 San Diego Aviators season is the 23rd season of the franchise in World TeamTennis (WTT) and its fourth playing in San Diego County, California.

Season recap

Outreach to Chargers fans
After the San Diego Chargers announced that the team would move to Los Angeles for the 2017 NFL season, the Aviators offered a 30% discount on season ticket packages for a limited time in the hopes of attracting disaffected Chargers fans. "We are San Diego sports fans and are so disappointed with the Chargers leaving we decided we had to
do something," said Aviators general manager Jim Ault. "The Aviators are the only professional sports team to win a championship for San Diego, and we would never leave America’s Finest City!"

Drafts
Because the 2016 WTT season schedule conflicted with the 2016 Olympics, teams were permitted to protect players who were eligible for protection in the 2016 draft based on playing for the team in 2015 (or 2014 and missing the 2015 season due to injury), went undrafted in the 2016 draft and did not participate in the league in 2016.

The Aviators did not make any selections and left James Blake and Madison Keys unprotected at the 2017 WTT Marquee Draft.

At the 2017 WTT Roster Draft, the Aviators protected Shelby Rogers, 2016 WTT Finals Most Valuable Player Raven Klaasen and Darija Jurak. In the third round of the draft, the Aviators left 2016 WTT Male Most Valuable Player Ryan Harrison unprotected and instead protected Klaasen's established doubles partner, Rajeev Ram. Taylor Fritz, Chanelle Scheepers and Květa Peschke, the final remaining player who played for the franchise when it was known as the New York Sportimes, were all left unprotected.

Harrison returns, and Aviators sign Broady
On May 27, 2017, the Aviators announced that they had re-signed 2016 WTT Male Most Valuable Player Ryan Harrison as a wildcard player.

On July 9, 2017, the Aviators announced that they had signed Naomi Broady as a substitute player. In 2016, Broady was tied with her Philadelphia Freedoms teammate Fabrice Martin for the best winning percentage in the league in mixed doubles.

Aviators sign Vandeweghe and Philippoussis
On July 20, 2017, the Aviators announced that they had signed San Diego County resident Coco Vandeweghe as a wildcard player.

On July 22, 2017, the Aviators announced that they had signed Mark Philippoussis as a substitute player.

Event chronology
 February 16, 2017: The Aviators left James Blake and Madison Keys unprotected at the WTT Marquee Draft.
 March 14, 2017: The Aviators protected Shelby Rogers, Raven Klaasen and Darija Jurak, protected Rajeev Ram as part of an established doubles team and left Ryan Harrison, Taylor Fritz, Chanelle Scheepers and Květa Peschke unprotected.
 May 27, 2017: The Aviators re-signed Ryan Harrison as a wildcard player.
 July 9, 2017: The Aviators signed Naomi Broady as a substitute player.
 July 20, 2017: The Aviators signed Coco Vandeweghe as a wildcard player.
 July 22, 2017: The Aviators signed Mark Philippoussis as a substitute player.

Draft picks
As 2016 WTT champions, the Aviators had the last selection in each of the league's drafts.

Marquee Draft
The Aviators did not select any players at the WTT Marquee Draft.

Roster Draft
The table below summarizes the selection made by the Aviators at the 2017 WTT Roster Draft.

Match log

Regular season
{| align="center" border="1" cellpadding="2" cellspacing="1" style="border:1px solid #aaa"
|-
! colspan="2" style="background:#CD231F; color:white" | Legend
|-
! bgcolor="ccffcc" | Aviators Win
! bgcolor="ffbbbb" | Aviators Loss
|-
! colspan="2" | Home team in CAPS
|}

Team personnel
References:

Players and coaches

 John Lloyd, Coach
 Naomi Broady
 Ryan Harrison
 Darija Jurak
 Raven Klaasen
 Mark Philippoussis
 Rajeev Ram
 Shelby Rogers
 Coco Vandeweghe

Front office
 Fred Luddy, Principal Owner
 Jack McGrory, Minority Owner
 Jim Ault, General Manager

Transactions
 February 16, 2017: The Aviators left James Blake and Madison Keys unprotected at the WTT Marquee Draft.
 March 14, 2017: The Aviators protected Shelby Rogers, Raven Klaasen and Darija Jurak, protected Rajeev Ram as part of an established doubles team and left Ryan Harrison, Taylor Fritz, Chanelle Scheepers and Květa Peschke unprotected.
 May 27, 2017: The Aviators re-signed Ryan Harrison as a wildcard player.
 July 9, 2017: The Aviators signed Naomi Broady as a substitute player.
 July 20, 2017: The Aviators signed Coco Vandeweghe as a wildcard player.
 July 22, 2017: The Aviators signed Mark Philippoussis as a substitute player.

See also

 Sports in San Diego

References

External links
San Diego Aviators official website
World TeamTennis official website

San Diego Aviators season
San Diego Aviators 2017
San Diego Aviators 2017
San Diego Aviators